Akshara is a 2021 Indian Telugu-language crime thriller film written and directed by B. Chinni Krishna, produced by Alluri Suresh Varma and Bellamkonda Ahiteja through Cinema Hall Entertainments. The film has an ensemble cast of Nandita Swetha, Sritej, Shakalaka Shankar, Ajay Ghosh, Satya and Madhunandan. Film's soundtrack is composed by Suresh Bobbili. After several delays, the film was released on 26 February 2021.

Cast 

 Nandita Swetha as Akshara
 Sritej as Sritej
 Shakalaka Shankar as Surya
 Ajay Ghosh as Pindi Tatha
 Satya as Sampath Sarangi
 Madhunandan as Madhu
 Harsha Vardhan as Master Raghava
Srikanth Iyyengar as Education Minister G. Gangaram
Kancharapalem Raju as RMP Doctor

Production 
The film was launched and muhurat shot was done on 17 November 2018. Filming was wrapped up in February 2019. Promotional teaser was released on 20 June 2019. Later, due to various reasons the film got delayed and scheduled to release in October 2019. But again, the film's release was postponed.

Soundtrack

Release 
Earlier on 5 September 2019, an announcement was made that the film will be released in October 2019. Finally, the film is released on 26 February 2021.

References 

 Akshara Movie Review : Letdown by predictability

2021 films
2020s Telugu-language films
Indian crime thriller films
2021 crime thriller films
Films shot in Andhra Pradesh
Films shot in Visakhapatnam
Films set in Andhra Pradesh
Films set in Visakhapatnam
Indian films based on plays